Ana Cecilia Blum (Guayaquil, March 17, 1972) is an Ecuadorian writer and journalist.

She studied Political and Social Sciences at the Vicente Rocafuerte Lay University of Guayaquil. She worked for several media and investigating about literature at the Catholic University of Guayaquil, Andean University of Quito and the FACSO University of Guayaquil. She currently lives between Ecuador and the United States.

Works
 Descanso sobre mi sombra
 Donde duerme el sueño
 I am opposed
 En estas tierras

External links
www.artepoetica.net  

1972 births
Living people
21st-century Ecuadorian women writers
Ecuadorian journalists
Ecuadorian women journalists
People from Guayaquil